Abias is a saint of the Coptic Church. He is included in the Heiligen-Lexicon by J. E. Stadler. A church in Alexandria is dedicated in his name. It is unknown what his feast day was if he ever had one.

References

Sources
Holweck, F. G. A Biographical Dictionary of the Saints. St. Louis, MO: B. Herder Book Co. 1924.

Christian saints in unknown century
Year of birth unknown
Year of death unknown
Coptic Orthodox saints